Sagala Gajendra Ratnayaka (born 27 February 1968) is a Sri Lankan politician. He was the Cabinet Minister of Southern Development; Law and Order, Youth Affairs, Project Management, Southern Development and Member of Parliament for Matara District. He served as Chief of Staff to the Prime Minister of Sri Lanka.

Early life and education
Ratnayaka was born to a political family from Deniyaya, where his uncle Victor Ratnayake, MBE was a notable legislator. He was educated at the Royal College Colombo, where he became the Head Prefect. He proceeded to study in the United States and graduated from Lewis & Clark College with a bachelor's degree in business administration studies in 1993.

Early career
After graduation, he worked as a financial analyst at Central Finance Company and joined HSBC Sri Lanka going on to become a credit operations manager.

Political career
He entered politics in 1999, having been elected as a member of the Southern Provincial Council. In 2000, he was elected to parliament from the Matara District. He served as Deputy Minister of Power and Energy from 2002 to 2004. Having been re-elected in 2010 and 2015. From January 2015 to September 2015 he served as the Chief of Staff to the Prime Minister until he was elected to parliament and appointed as a Cabinet minister. He served as a Cabinet minister till 2019 when he resigned from his portfolio.

See also
List of political families in Sri Lanka

References

External links
Biographies of Member of Parliament
Right Royal rally of old Royalists in the Sri Lanka Parliament

Government ministers of Sri Lanka
United National Party politicians
Sri Lankan Buddhists
Alumni of Royal College, Colombo
Lewis & Clark College alumni
Members of the 11th Parliament of Sri Lanka
Members of the 12th Parliament of Sri Lanka
Members of the 13th Parliament of Sri Lanka
Members of the 15th Parliament of Sri Lanka
1968 births
Living people
Sinhalese politicians